Lovin' Every Minute of It is the fourth studio album, released in 1985 by the rock band Loverboy. The album became a hit thanks to the title track which reached #9 at US Hot 100, while "This Could Be The Night" was #10, "Dangerous" #65 and "Lead A Double Life" #68. The album went double platinum, being the last of the band's to do so.

Due to scheduling conflicts this is the first album the band did not use Bruce Fairbairn as their producer.  Tom Allom was hired as a replacement.

Cash Box said of the single "Lead a Double Life" that "Loverboy’s trademark straightforward pop/rock angle is given a slight 'new music,' Devo-ish bent here."  Billboard said it borrows "aggressive mannerisms from the new wave."

Track listing

Personnel
All information from the album booklet.

Loverboy
 Mike Reno – lead vocals  
 Paul Dean – guitar, backing vocals, producer
 Doug Johnson – keyboards
 Scott Smith – bass, backing vocals
 Matt Frenette – drums

Additional backing vocals
 Jaime St. James
 Mark LaFrance
 Nancy Nash
 Ra McGuire
 Rick Livingstone
 Tommy Thayer

Production
 Tom Allom – producer
 Mark Dodson – engineer
 Bernie Grundman – mastering
 James O'Mara – photography
 Ron Obvious – assistant engineer
 Holland MacDonald – art direction
 Elizabeth Legge – artwork

Charts

Certifications

Notes

1985 albums
Loverboy albums
Columbia Records albums
Albums produced by Tom Allom
Albums recorded at Little Mountain Sound Studios